Ramburelles is a commune in the Somme department in Hauts-de-France in northern France. Paul Eugène Delattre (1830–1898), lawyer, politician, writer and the essayist and historian Maurice Vaussard (1888–1978) were born in Ramburelles.

Geography

Population

History
 In 1218, Bishop Evrard puts the parish under the deanship of Oisemont.
 In the 14th century, it came under the provost of the Vimeu.
 In 1922, the local council agreed to the installation of a telephone kiosk. It wasn't working until 1924.
.

 In 1922 and 1923,  electrification came to the village. Public buildings waited until 1929.
 In 1932, the local council agreed to provide a fresh water supply to the commune. It wasn't completed until 1953.
 Before leaving, in 1944, the Germans burnt down the school and the chateau.
 in 1948, the roads of the commune were covered in tarmac for the first time.

Heraldry

Places of interest
 The traces of a castle can be seen in pastureland near the village.
 The sixteenth century church, completed in 1536
 The château
 The war memorial, from 1922
 Ancient wells, used until clean water was supplied to the village.
 The school. It was planned in 1878 and built soon after.

See also
Communes of the Somme department

References

Communes of Somme (department)